Elmwood-St. Joseph Municipal Cemetery is located in Mason City, Iowa, United States. It was listed as a historic district on the National Register of Historic Places in 2018.

History
The first cemetery in the city was a small burial ground established in 1853 in the northeast section of town. Elmwood Cemetery had its beginnings on May 11, 1867 when the Mason City Cemetery Association bought  of land from John Dexter on the southwest side of the city. St. Joseph Cemetery was established just to the north of the Mason City Cemetery in 1875. The bodies from the cemetery on the northeast side of town were relocated to Mason City Cemetery in 1893, and its name was changed to Elmwood the following year. The first of Elmwood's seven mausoleum's was completed in 1908. Mason City took over operations of both cemeteries in 1949 when they were deeded to the city, and Elmwood-St. Joseph Municipal Cemetery was created. In 1958 the low areas of the cemetery were filled in and the water pond was created at the same time. The cemetery's office building was also constructed in 1958. The cemetery contains the graves of many of the community's pioneers, city founders, and civic leaders. There are military veterans from the American Civil War to the present.

Notable burials
Notable burials include:
Henry I. Smith, American Civil War Medal of Honor recipient
Meredith Willson, composer

References

Cemeteries on the National Register of Historic Places in Iowa
Historic districts on the National Register of Historic Places in Iowa
National Register of Historic Places in Mason City, Iowa
Historic districts in Cerro Gordo County, Iowa
Protected areas of Cerro Gordo County, Iowa